Madhuca lancifolia is a tree in the family Sapotaceae. The specific epithet lancifolia means "lance-shaped leaves".

Description
The bark is brown. Inflorescences bear up to 10 flowers.

Distribution and habitat
Madhuca lancifolia is endemic to Borneo. Its habitat is lowland mixed dipterocarp forest.

Conservation
Madhuca lancifolia has been assessed as vulnerable on the IUCN Red List. The species is threatened by logging and conversion of land for palm oil plantations.

References

lancifolia
Endemic flora of Borneo
Trees of Borneo
Plants described in 1925
Taxa named by William Burck